Eric T. Vogel (1896 – 1980) was a Czech jazz trumpeter.  In 1938, Vogel played trumpet in a dixieland combo.  After being arrested at Brno in 1939 he was made to organize a jazz school in the Jewish ghetto of that city.  In Theresienstadt concentration camp he played with Martin Roman's Ghetto Swingers and Fritz Weiss's Jazz-Quintet-Weiss.  He escaped while being transferred to Dachau concentration camp.

References

External links
Amanda Petrusich, "The Jewish Trumpeter Who Entertained Nazis to Survive the Holocaust", The New Yorker, April 22, 2019.

1896 births
1980 deaths
Czech jazz musicians
Czech Jews
Theresienstadt Ghetto survivors
Dixieland trumpeters
Nazi-era ghetto inmates
20th-century trumpeters
Ghetto Swingers members